Blasco Francisco Collaço (born 16 May 1931) is an Indian prelate of the Catholic Church who spent his career in the diplomatic service of the Holy See, including thirty years as an apostolic nuncio.

Biography
Blasco Francisco Collaço was born in Raia, Goa, India, on 16 May 1931. He attended the Seminary of Rachol from 1941 to 1953. He was ordained a priest on 2 May 1954. Studying from 1954 to 1957 at Rome's Pontifical Urban University, he earned a doctorate in canon law. He spent the next year at the Pontifical Academy of Social Sciences. To prepare for a diplomatic career he entered the Pontifical Ecclesiastical Academy in 1959.

He entered the diplomatic service of the Holy See in 1961 and filled assignments in Colombia, Australia (an office with responsibility for New Zealand and Oceania), France, Scandinavia, and Honduras. Beginning in 1976, he worked in the Roman Curia in the Office of Public Affairs.

On 23 September 1977, Pope Paul VI named Apostolic Nuncio to Panama and a titular archbishop. He was consecrated a bishop on 5 November 1977 by Cardinal Jean-Marie Villot. He was the first Indian and the first Goan priest to have the title of "Nuncio".

On 26 July 1982, Pope John Paul II appointed him apostolic nuncio to the Dominican Republic. He became Apostolic Delegate to Puerto Rico that year as well.

On 28 February 1991, Pope John Paul named him Apostolic Pro-Nuncio to both Madagascar and Mauritius. He added the title apostolic nuncio to Seychelles on 4 May 1994.

On 13 April 1996, Pope John Paul appointed him Apostolic Nuncio to Bulgaria, where the Church and the government remained at odds over the restitution of Church property since the collapse of Communism in 1989.

On 24 May 2000, he appointed Collaço Apostolic Nuncio to South Africa and to Namibia, and Apostolic Delegate to Botswana. On 24 June 2000, he added the responsibilities of Apostolic Nuncio to Lesotho and to Swaziland.

Collaço retired from these positions in August 2006.

He appears as a character in the novel The Fifth Gospel by Ian Caldwell.

See also
 List of heads of the diplomatic missions of the Holy See

References

External links 
Catholic Hierarchy: Archbishop Blasco Francisco Collaço 

Living people
1931 births
Pontifical Ecclesiastical Academy alumni
Apostolic Nuncios to Panama
Apostolic Nuncios to the Dominican Republic
Apostolic Nuncios to Madagascar
Apostolic Nuncios to Mauritius
Apostolic Nuncios to Seychelles
Apostolic Nuncios to Bulgaria
Apostolic Nuncios to South Africa
Apostolic Nuncios to Namibia
Apostolic Nuncios to Botswana
Apostolic Nuncios to Lesotho
Apostolic Nuncios to Eswatini